Targa West was a rally event held in and around Perth, Western Australia between 2005 and 2021.  The event takes its name from the Targa Florio, a former motoring event held on the island of Sicily, as well as more recent Australian events including Targa Tasmania, now defunct East Coast Targa, Targa New Zealand and Classic Adelaide.

The inaugural event was held in 2005 and won by Ross Dunkerton.  Dunkerton also won the 2006 event which ran for four days from 7 September 2006 in a Mitsubishi Lancer EVO IX.

2006

After the official start at Forrest Place in central Perth, special stages were held in John Forrest National Park, Gidgegannup, Araluen, Muchea, Chittering, Bindoon and Toodyay.

76 teams entered in one of two classes: Challenge (cars without roll cages) and Competition.

Brock and co-driver Mick Hone were in a 2001 Daytona Sportscar. Hone was taken to hospital and made a recovery.

References

External links
TargaWest website

Road rallying
Motorsport competitions in Australia
Rally competitions in Australia
Sports competitions in Western Australia
Motorsport in Western Australia